The 2018–19 Robert Morris Colonials women's basketball team represents Robert Morris University during the 2018–19 NCAA Division I women's basketball season. The Colonials, led by third year head coach Charlie Buscaglia, play their home games at the North Athletic Complex, as members of the Northeast Conference. They finished the season 22–11, 16–2 in Northeast Conference play win the Northeast Conference regular season title. They won the Northeast women's tournament and earn an received automatic bid of the NCAA women's tournament where they lost to Louisville in the first round.

Roster

Schedule and results

|-
!colspan=9 style=| Non-conference regular season

|-
!colspan=9 style=| NEC regular season

|-
!colspan=9 style=| NEC Women's Tournament

|-
!colspan=9 style=| NCAA Women's Tournament

See also
2018–19 Robert Morris Colonials men's basketball team

References

Robert Morris Colonials women's basketball seasons
Robert Morris Colonials
Robert Morris Colonials women's basketball team
Robert Morris Colonials women's basketball team
Robert Morris